Arthur Guiterman (November 20, 1871 Vienna – January 11, 1943 New York) was an American writer best known for his humorous poems.

Life and career
Guiterman was born of American parents in Vienna. His father was Alexander Gütermann, born in the Bavarian village Redwitz an der Rodach, and his mother was Louisa Wolf, born in Cincinnati. Arthur graduated from the City College of New York in 1891, and later was married in 1909 to Vida Lindo. He was an editor of the Woman's Home Companion and the Literary Digest.  In 1910, he cofounded the Poetry Society of America, and later served as its president in 1925–26.

An example of his humour is a poem that talks about modern progress, with rhyming couplets such as "First dentistry was painless;/Then bicycles were chainless". It ends on a more telling note:

Another Guiterman poem, "On the Vanity of Earthly Greatness", illustrates the philosophy also incorporated into his humorous rhymes:

Perhaps his most-quoted poem is his 1936 "D.A.R.ling" satire about the Daughters of the American Revolution (and three other clubs open only to descendants of pre-Independence British Americans). That poem has an intricate, strongly dramatic rhythmical structure.

He also notably wrote the libretto for Walter Damrosch's The Man Without a Country which premiered at the Metropolitan Opera in New York City on May 12, 1937.

Bibliography

Poetry
Collections

 
 
List of poems

Translations

Footnotes

References

External links

 
 
 
November 28, 1915, New York Times, Poets' Opportunities Greater than Ever Before; Arthur Guiterman Tells How to Make a Living Out of Verse and Gives a List of Don'ts for Aspiring Poets;- Advises Writing on Topical Themes

American male poets
American humorists
American humorous poets
American magazine editors
City College of New York alumni
The New Yorker people
American opera librettists
1871 births
1943 deaths
American male non-fiction writers